Kristina Ruslanovna Pimenova (born 27 December 2005) is a Russian model living in the United States.

Life and career 
Pimenova's parents are former footballer Ruslan Pimenov and former model Glikeriya Shirokova. Pimenova has an elder half-sister. Pimenova started working as a child model before her fourth birthday, after her mother sent photographs to the agency President Kids. Pimenova has worked for brands including Armani, Benetton, Burberry, and Roberto Cavalli.

In 2014, Women Daily magazine called her "the most beautiful girl in the world".

In Moscow, Pimenova practiced rhythmic gymnastics, under Olga Kapranova. In 2013, she competed in a gymnastics tournament in Tatarstan organized by Alina Kabaeva, winning a gold medal in her age group.

In April 2015, she appeared on the cover of Vogue Kids.

Later in 2015, Pimenova moved to California, USA with her mother. A documentary about Pimenova aired on RTL Television in October 2016.

Acting 
Pimenova played a post-production part as a singing child in the Italian fantasy film Creators: The Past. In an interview for Posh Kids Magazine, she expressed her wish to become a professional actress and film director. She was subsequently cast for the role of Dasha in Michael S. Ojeda's horror thriller The Russian Bride, co-starring with Corbin Bernsen and Oksana Orlan.

Criticism 
When Pimenova's mother managed her social media accounts, there was some criticism of the content as an example of sexualisation of an under-age model. Her mother disagreed, maintaining that all the photos were perfectly innocent and "you must think like a pedophile in order to see something sexual in these pictures".

Filmography

References

External links 

 
 
 
 
 

2005 births
21st-century Russian actresses
Actresses from California
Child models
Russian female models
Russian film actresses
Living people
Female models from Moscow
Russian child actresses
21st-century American women
Russian expatriates in the United States